Zirrah or Zir Rah or Zirah may refer to:
 Zirrah, Bushehr
 Zir Rah, Tangestan
 Zirrah, Bagh-e Malek, Khuzestan Province
 Zir Rah, Ramhormoz, Khuzestan Province
 Zirrah Rural District, in Bushehr Province

See also
 Zirrah Amirqoli